Neonatal hypocalcemia is an abnormal clinical and laboratory hypocalcemia condition that is frequently observed in infants. It is commonly presented within the first 72 hours of a newborn's life.

Healthy term infants go through a physiological nadir of serum calcium levels at 7.5 - 8.5 mg/dL by day 2 of life. Hypocalcemia is a low blood calcium level. A total serum calcium of less than 8 mg/dL (2mmol/L) or ionized calcium less than 1.2 mmol/L in term neonates is defined as hypocalcemia. In preterm infants, it is defined as less than 7mg/dL (1.75 mmol/L) total serum calcium or less than 4mg/dL (1 mmol/L) ionized calcium.

Both early onset hypocalcemia (presents within 72h of birth) and late onset hypocalcemia (presents in 3-7 days after birth) require calcium supplementation treatment.

Infants with intrauterine growth retardation, perinatal asphyxia, preterm, and diabetic mothers are most likely to develop neonatal hypocalcemia. It is not understood why premature infants have hypocalcemia, but a proposed idea is that a large increase of calcitonin may lead to hypocalcemia. Another hypothesis includes impaired secretion of PTH or Parathyroid hormone.

Cause
Risk factors of early neonatal hypocalcemia 
 Prematurity
 Perinatal asphyxia
 Diabetes mellitus in the mother
 Maternal hyperparathyroidism
 Intrauterine growth retardation (IUGR)
 Iatrogenic

Risk factors
Risk factors of late neonatal hypocalcemia
 Exogenous phosphate load
 Use of gentamicin
 Gender and ethnic: late neonatal hypocalcemia occurred more often in male infants and Hispanic infants
 Others
 Magnesium deficiency
 Transient hypoparathyroidism of newborn
 Hypoparathyroidism due to other causes (DiGeorge Syndrome)

References 

 Jain, A., Agarwal, R., Sankar, M. J., Deorari, A., & Paul, V. K. (2010). Hypocalcemia in the newborn. Indian Journal of Pediatrics, 77, 1123-1128.
 Oden, J., Bourgeois, M. (2000). Neonatal endocrinology. Indian Journal of Pediatrics, 77, 21

Calcium
Electrolyte disturbances